Jerrier A. "Jerry" Haddad (July 17, 1922 – March 31, 2017) was an American pioneer computer engineer who was the co-developer and designer of the IBM 701 series which was IBM's first commercial scientific computer and its first mass-produced mainframe computer.

The IBM 701 started the line of IBM 700/7000 series which were responsible for bringing electronic computing to the world and for IBM's dominance in the mainframe computer market during the 1960s and 1970s that continues today. The lower-cost general-purpose version of the IBM 701 was the famous IBM 650, which became the first mass-produced computer in the world.

Haddad was responsible for engineering and both system and circuit-level design, and managed the approximately 200 engineers involved. In 1984, along with Nathaniel Rochester, he received the Computer Pioneer Award.

Haddad was also the co-developer of the IBM 604, the world's first mass-produced programmable electronic calculator, along with Ralph Palmer. 

He was a fellow of both the Institute of Electrical and Electronics Engineers and the American Association for the Advancement of Science, and was a member of the National Academy of Engineering.

Biography
Haddad was born in New York City, to a family of Syrian and Lebanese origin. He received a Bachelor of Science in Electrical Engineering, Cornell University, 1945. He studied in the Advanced Business Management Program at Harvard Business School in 1958. Haddad lived in Briarcliff Manor, New York with his wife and five children.

Haddad was the co-developer of the IBM 604, the world's first mass-produced programmable electronic calculator, and jointly directed the IBM 701 electronic defense calculator program with Nathaniel Rochester. Haddad was the vice president of technical personnel development when he retired from IBM in 1981. Haddad held 18 patents for inventions in the computer and electronics fields.

Honors and Awards:
 Member, National Academy of Engineering, 1968
 Recipient, Order of the Cedars Medal, Lebanon, 1970
 Honorary Doctorate of Sciences, Union College, 1971
 Honorary Doctorate of Sciences, Clarkson College, 1978
 Institute of Electrical and Electronics Engineers (IEEE) Computer Pioneer Award, 1984
 Fellow, IEEE
 Fellow, American Association for the Advancement of Science
Haddad received honorary doctor degrees of science from Union College in 1971 and Clarkson University in 1978. In 1970, he received the Order of the Cedars Medal from the Republic of Lebanon for his technical and scientific achievements.

References

External links 

 The Computer Pioneers: The Development of the IBM 701. Segment 1–5. July 12th, 1983. Jerrier Haddad, Clarence Frizzell, Nathan Rochester, and Richard Whalen

1922 births
2017 deaths
Engineers from New York (state)
Cornell University College of Engineering alumni
Fellow Members of the IEEE
Fellows of the American Association for the Advancement of Science
American people of Syrian descent
American people of Lebanese descent
People from Briarcliff Manor, New York